Ľudovít Rajter (30 July 1906 in Bazin, Kingdom of Hungary – 6 July 2000 in Bratislava, Slovakia) was a Hungarian composer and conductor from Slovakia. The Rajter family immigrated to Hungary from South Germany, but were of Dutch origin.

Life 
Rajter's evangelical family had German-Hungarian roots. His father worked as a teacher, cantor, and choral conductor in the service of the Evangelical Church A.B. Rajter's family came from southern Germany and came to Hungary in the time of Maria Theresa (c. 1740). In that time the family name was still "Raiter" or "Rayter". Rajter's family spoke three languages: Hungarian, German, and Slovak, and Rajter kept this habit to the end of his life.

Professional background 
He received his first musical training from his father Lajos Rajter Sr (1880–1945), then (from 1920) in the music school in Bratislava (with Alexander Albrecht). After completion of this school and after graduation at the Protestant Lycée A.B. In 1924 he enrolled at the Academy of Music and Performing Arts in Vienna. He was taught by the composer Franz Schmidt and Joseph Marx (composition), Clemens Krauss (conductor) and Alexander Wunderer (orchestral conductor). At that time Rajter was also assistant to Clemens Krauss (until 1933).

Hungary 
After the Viennese studies he changed to the Liszt Ferenc Zeneművészeti Főiskola in 1929, where he became a student of Ernst von Dohnányi. In 1935 he became the first conductor of the Hungarian Radio Orchestra in Budapest. He continued this activity until 1945. He also worked as a professor at the Academy of Music in Budapest. During this time, Rajter received numerous invitations from major foreign orchestras; Numerous works by Béla Bartók and Zoltán Kodály were premiered under his conductor's staff.

Post-war years 

In 1946, Rajter returned to Czechoslovakia and worked until 1949 as chief of the Czechoslovak Radio Orchestra in Bratislava. In 1949, together with Václav Talich, he became the founder of the Slovak Philharmonic whose first conductor he later became. In the Stalinist period (beginning of the 1950s), Rajter did not appear to be sufficiently "politically reliable" to the Communist rulers of the time, so he was prohibited from conducting and was banned as an "archivist" in the Philharmonic Archives Which had been home to him since the founding of the orchestra in the Redsburg press in Prussia [4]. It was not until 1953 (after Stalin's death) that he was appointed the head of the Slovak Philharmonic Orchestra until 1961. But even later he never belonged to the "beneficiaries" of the then-popular Czechoslovakia. Ladislav Slovák, the Shostakovich admirer, was given the position of the chief dignitary at that time.

In 1966, Rajter conducted the Masterclass for Conductors at the Mozarteum in Salzburg during the Summer Academy.

In 1968 he returned to the radio orchestra of the Czechoslovak Radio, where he worked until his retirement in 1976 as chief conductor.

Rajter was a European, a body and soul, already at a time when this word was not yet modern. His appearance as well as his conducting style was full of elegance and nobility. But also his overall appearance, his high, slender figure and an incredible security at the conductor's desk were always impressive for the audience. He mastered and directed many works of the music world literature by heart. For example, all the symphonies of Ludwig van Beethoven, as well as a part of the works of Mozart and Joseph Haydn.

Since the founding of the Academy of Performing Arts in Bratislava in 1949, he also worked as a teacher at this institution until 1976. After his rehabilitation in 1991 he was awarded the title of professor of this institution.

Rajter, however, also led a lively musical life with numerous concert performances. In the 1980s he was considered the oldest active conductor in the world. Despite his high age, he also received numerous invitations from many important foreign orchestras during this time. The symphonic orchestra of Steinamanger appointed him in 1991 as the honorary member of the orchestra for life time.

Death 
Rajter died on 6 July 2000 in Bratislava. His mortal remains were transferred to his native town of Pezinok, where he was buried.

The composer 
As a composer, Rajter developed his own style. His work has its roots in the Viennese and Budapest composition school. (Franz Schmidt, Ernst von Dohnányi, Béla Bártók, Alexander Albrecht). Numerous online recordings of his own work, as well as works by other composers who have performed under his baton, are available on YouTube and are also available on Spotify.

Albums 
 Dvorak: Symphony No. 2 / Legends Op. 59, Nos. 6–10
 Down The River Hah & Dances From The Hron Region
 Symphonies nos. 1 & 2
 Zemlinsky: Symphony No. 1 / Das Gläserne Herz
 Copland: Appalachian Spring; Rodeo; Billy the Kid; Fanfare for the Common Man (Czecho-Slovak Radio Symphony Orchestra (Bratislava), conductor: Stephen Gunzenhauser
 The Fantastic Symphony (Episode from an Artist's Life), op. 14 / The Roman Carnival, op. 9
 Symphonies nos. 3 & 4 / Piano Concerto no. 1 / Alto Rhapsody

Awards 
 1936: Dr.h.c. New York College of Music
 1994: Bártók-Pásztory Award (Bártók-Pásztory-Díj)
 1997: Honorary Cross for Science and Art of the Republic of Austria, 1st Class
 2000: honorary member of the Hungarian Academy of Arts
 2007: Pribina Cross of the first class / in memoriam (Pribinov kríž 1. triedy) 
 2017: Ján Cikker Price in memoriam (cena Jána Cikkera)

External links
 Prof. Dr. h. c. Ľudovít Rajter (online, slowakisch)
 Biography, list of works, bibliography, etc
 Új szó, Bratislava vom 29. Juli 2006 (Ungarisch)
 Legendárny dirigent očami syna Adriana: Slávu sme neriešili – Aktuality.sk (Slowakisch), [„Ein legendärer Dirigent mit den Augen seines Sohnes Adrian gesehen“] Interview mit Sohn Adrian Rajter vom 1. August 2010 (www.aktuality.sk)
 Mesto Pezinok | Ľudovít Rajter (www.pezinok.sk) (Slowakisch)
 Ľudovít Rajter: Symphonische Werke (CD) – jpc (in https://www.jpc.de)/

1906 births
2000 deaths
People from Pezinok
Slovak composers
Male composers
Hungarian composers
Hungarian male composers
Slovak conductors (music)
Male conductors (music)
Hungarian conductors (music)
University of Music and Performing Arts Vienna alumni
20th-century composers
20th-century conductors (music)
20th-century Hungarian male musicians
Slovak male musicians